Robbie James Joaquin Capito (born 19 June 2001)  is a Hong Kong professional pool player. He is most known for defeating the reigning world number one pool player Eklent Kaçi at the 2018 WPA World Nine-ball Championship when he was 17 years old. He is a former two-time junior 9-ball world championship Finalist. Two-time Junior Asian Champion and four-time Hong Kong Champion. He won his first Men's national event at the age of 12 while snapping off the juniors in the same event.

Career
In 2017, he was voted Hong Kong's Most Outstanding Junior Athletes of 2017, having won gold at the Asian Pool Championships, and a silver in the boys' under–17 category at the Junior World 9-ball Championships . The following year Capito finished as runner-up in the U19s final. He then snapped off both the singles and doubles event at the 2019 Asian Pool Championships U19.
In 2018, Capito reached the last 16 of the 2018 WPA World Nine-ball Championship, after defeating world number one Eklent Kaçi in the last 32, 11–10, when he was 17 years old. Capito defeated Kaçi after falling behind 7–1 earlier in the match. He lost in the next round to Joshua Filler.

Personal life
Capito was born on 19 June 2001 in Hong Kong. His parents are both natives of the Philippines. He says that he started playing pool aged two years old, after buying a mini pool table from Toys R Us, and would later play in his first pool room aged five.

References

External links

 Robbie Capito at Propool.com

Living people
2001 births
Hong Kong pool players
Hong Kong people of Filipino descent